The Battle of Warsaw took place near Warsaw on , between the armies of the Polish–Lithuanian Commonwealth and Sweden and Brandenburg. It was a major battle in the Second Northern War between Poland and Sweden in the period 1655–1660, also known as The Deluge. According to Hajo Holborn, it marked "the beginning of Prussian military history".

In the battle, a smaller Swedish-Brandenburg force, but with the fire superiority of infantry and artillery gained victory over a Polish–Lithuanian force superior in numbers, though in the long term the victory achieved little.  Polish–Lithuanian losses were insignificant, since the Polish noble levy promptly and unbroken retreated from the battlefield.

Prelude 

The Polish–Lithuanian forces, commanded by King John II Casimir of Poland, comprised about 24–25,000 regulars, which included only 950 Winged Hussars (8 banners), 2,000 Tatars and 10–13,000 of the noble levy (pospolite ruszenie), altogether some 40,000 men of which only about 4,500 were infantry. The allied armies of Sweden and Brandenburg, commanded by King Charles X of Sweden and Elector Frederick William of Brandenburg, were only 18,000 strong, comprising 12,500 cavalry (60 squadrons), and 5,500 infantry (15 brigades), which included 8,500 Brandenburg men. Second in command of Brandenburg's forces was Otto Christoph von Sparr.

John II Casimir ferried his army across the Vistula River and met the approaching Swedish-Brandenburg force on its right bank, about five kilometers to the north of the suburb of Praga. Charles X had initially hoped to destroy the Lithuanian and Tatar forces before they joined up with the remainder of the Commonwealth army, but this plan failed. Some officers of Brandenburg considered the Polish–Lithuanian forces to be overwhelming in numbers and instead advocated a retreat.

First day 
Charles marched his allied army down the right (east) bank of the Vistula on 28 July and assaulted the Polish army.  However, the Polish infantry had dug into a narrow corridor along the river bank, which prevented them from being dislodged.

Second day 
Charles, wheeling left, moved his entire army to the Polish right, through the Białołęka Forest onto a narrow plain, consolidating his position before the Polish hussars could react.  Aleksander Polbinski's 800 hussars drove into the three lines of cavalry, reiter, guarding the flanks of Charles' infantry.  The hussars broke through the first line of Uppland and Småland regiments, but deprived of support, they were stopped by the flank fire of the Swedish regiments. As a result of the attack, Charles Gustav was in danger and wounded.  The kozacka cavalry, the pancerna, did not participate in the attack, being held in reserve.  Seeing that the Swede-Brandenburg allies held their ground, John II Casimir withdrew his army across the Vistula bridge, covered by his cavalry.

Third day 

The Swede and Brandenburg allies occupied the open plain and the Polish–Lithuanian cavalry escaped along the Vistula and John Casimir abandoned Warsaw again.

Aftermath 
The Brandenburg and Swedish allies occupied Radom on 10 Aug., and the Brandenburg garrisons replaced the Swedes in Wielkopolska, but then they refused to support the Swedes any further, forcing Charles to withdraw north to Royal Prussia.  John Casimir quickly regrouped at Lublin.

The Battle of Warsaw is commemorated on the Tomb of the Unknown Soldier, Warsaw, with the inscription "Warszawa 30 V-1 VII, 28–30 VII 1656".

See also 
Brandenburg-Prussia

References

Further reading
 Curt Jany: History of the Prussian Army - From the 15th century to 1914, Volume 1, Biblio Verlag, Osnabrück 1967, pp. 120–130
 Svenska Slagfält, 2003, (Walhlström & Widstrand) 
 Miroslav Nagielski, "Warszawa 1656", Bellona (1990)
 J.Cichowski & A.Szulczynski, "Husaria", MON (1981)
 Leszek Podhorodecki, "Rapier i koncerz", Książka i Wiedza (1985)

External links

Battle of Warsaw 1656

Warsaw 1656
1656 in Poland
Warsaw
Warsaw
Warsaw
Warsaw 1656
Warsaw 1656